The Sandford St Martin Trust is a United Kingdom-based religious charity. It was established in 1978 to promote excellence in religious broadcasting. Each year the Trust holds an awards ceremony for outstanding achievement in religious broadcasting. The awards ceremony is held at Lambeth Palace where prize money of approximately £10,000 is awarded to winners. Categories have included radio, TV, and a Local and Community Award (made in 2014). In 2015 the Sandford St Martin Trust Awards introduced a new children's category for content aimed at under-18s.

The Sandford St Martin Trust also administer a joint "Readers' Award" with the Radio Times for a programme chosen by readers of that magazine.

The Trust is administered by up to twelve trustees. The current chair is the Rt Rev'd Jan McFarlane, Bishop of Repton. Trustees include the broadcasters Roger Bolton and Torin Douglas MBE.

Special awards

2015 

Children's Broadcasting Award: Children of the Holocaust, Fettle Animation for BBC Two

Children's Broadcasting Runner-up: Children of Kabul- An Uncertain Future, A CBBC Newsround Special

Trustees’ Award: Lyse Doucet, Broadcast Journalist

2014 

Local, Community and Online Award: Sounds Jewish: The Jewish Revival in Poland, JW3: Jewish Community Center for London for Guardian.com website

Personal Award: Melvyn Bragg, Broadcaster

Trustees Award: Sir John Tavener, Composer

2013 

Trustees’ Award: Olympic Opening Ceremony 2012, Director: Danny Boyle, Writer: Frank Cottrell Boyce for BBC One

Personal Award: Jonathan Sacks, Former Chief Rabbi

Television Awards

2015
 Winner: One Million Dubliners, Underground Films for RTÉ One
 Runner-up: Marvellous, Fifty Fathoms and Tiger Aspect Productions for BBC Two

2014
 Winner: The Story of the Jews, Oxford Film and TV for BBC Two, Presenter: Simon Schama
 Runner-up: A Very British Ramadan, Watershed Productions for Channel 4
 Runner-up: Hillsborough – Never Forgotten, BBC Religion and Ethics for BBC Two

2013 
 Premier Award: David Suchet: In the Footsteps of St Paul - CTVC/Jerusalem Productions for BBC One, Presenter: David Suchet
 Runner-Up: Goodbye to Canterbury - BBC Factual Arts for BBC Two, Presenter: Rowan Williams, former Archbishop of Canterbury
 Merit Award: Islam: The Untold Story - Maya Vision International for Channel 4
 Radio Times Readers' Award: David Suchet: In the Footsteps of St Paul - CTVC/Jerusalem Productions for BBC One

2012
 Premier Award: Life of Muhammad - Crescent Films / Rageh Omaar for BBC Two, Presenter: Rageh Omaar
 Runner-Up:  The King James Bible: The Book that Changed the World - BBC Religion & Ethics for BBC Two, Presenter: Melvyn Bragg
 Merit Award: Ian Hislop: When Bankers Were Good - Wingspan Productions for BBC Two, Presenter: Ian Hislop
 Merit Award: Wonderland: A Hasidic Guide to Love, Marriage and Finding a Bride - BBC Factual for BBC Two
 Radio Times Readers' Award: Songs of Praise 50th Anniversary - BBC One / BBC Religion & Ethics

2011
 Premier Award: The Nativity - Red Planet Pictures / BBC Wales for BBC One
 Runner-up: Our World: God’s Beggar Children - BBC News Channel / BBC World News
 Merit Award: Benedict: Trials of a Pope - BBC Religion & Ethics for BBC Two
 Merit Award: Rev - Big Talk Productions for BBC Two
 Radio Times Readers' Award: The Nativity - Red Planet Pictures / BBC Wales for BBC One

2010
 Premier Award: The Bible: A History, Episode 1: Creation - Pioneer Productions for Channel 4, Presenter: Howard Jacobson
 Runner-Up: A History of Christianity, Episode 1 - BBC Religion & Ethics for BBC Four, Presenter: Prof Diarmaid MacCulloch
 Merit: 1984: A Sikh Story - BBC Religion & Ethics for BBC One, Presenter: Sonia Deol
 Merit: Did Darwin Kill God? - BBC Religion & Ethics for BBC Two, Presenter: Conor Cunningham
 Radio Times Readers' Award: A History of Christianity, Episode 1 - BBC Religion & Ethics for BBC Four, Presenter: Prof Diarmaid MacCulloch

2009
 Premier Award:  Miracle on the Estate - BBC Religion & Ethics for BBC One
 Runner-up: The Passion, Episode 3 - BBC Drama / Deep Indigo / HBO for BBC One
 Runner-up: The Qu’ran - Juniper / Antony Thomas for Channel Four
 Merit Award: Dispatches: Saving Africa’s Witch Children - Red Rebel / Oxford Scientific Films for Channel Four

2008
 Premier Award: The Boys from Baghdad High

2007 
Premier Award: Greater Love Hath No Man – BBC Religion and Ethics for BBC1
Runner-up: Art & Soul – BBC Scotland and TV Factual Aberdeen for BBC2 Scotland
Merit Award: The Convent – BBC Religion and Ethics for BBC1
Merit Award: Every Parent’s Nightmare – BBC Religion and Ethics for BBC1

2006 
Premier Award: 7/7: A Test of Faith – Granada Factual North for ITV1
Runner-up: Priest Idol – Diverse (Bristol) in association with Jerusalem Productions for Channel 4
Merit Award: Tsunami: Where Was God? – 3BM for Channel 4
Merit Award: The Monastery –  Tiger Aspect in association with Jerusalem Productions for BBC2

2005 
Premier Award: Victim 0001 – CTVC for ITV1
Runner-Up: Children of Abraham – 3BM Television for Channel 4
Merit Award: Karbala – City of Martyrs – ITN for Channel 4
Merit Award: Jointly awarded to Jesus Who? – BBC Religion and Ethics for BBC1 and The Battle for Britain’s Soul – BBC Religion and Ethics for BBC2

2004 
Premier Award: The Naked Pilgrim – Wag TV for Five
Runner-up: Some of My Best Friends Are… – Lion Television for Channel 4
Merit Award: Songs of Praise – BBC1

Radio Awards

2015 

 Winner: No Destination, Reel Soul Movies for BBC Radio 4
 Runner-up: For the Love of God, BBC Asian Network

2014 
 Winner: I Have a Dream, BBC Scotland Features for BBC Radio 4
 Runner-up: Married For a Minute, BBC Asian Network

2013 

 Premier Award: Hearing Ragas, BBC Radio 4
 Runner-up: Blasphemy & the Governor of the Punjab, BBC Radio 4
 Merit: The Pulse Passion, Whistling Frog Productions, HCJB Global for the Pulse

2012 

 Premier Award: Resurrection Stories, BBC Radio Scotland
 Runner-up: Faith and 9/11, TBI Media for BBC Radio 2
 Merit: Something Understood: Abraham, Unique Productions for BBC Radio 4
 Merit: Good Friday Reflection, Central FM

2011 

 Premier Award: King James Bible: Readings, BBC Religion & Ethics for BBC Radio 4
 Runner-up: The Pope’s British Divisions, BBC Radio Current Affairs for BBC Radio 4
 Merit: Good Friday Special, Prison Radio Association for National Prison Radio
 Merit: Jesus Meek and Mild, The Pulse, West Yorkshire
 Merit: All Things Considered: Sarah Joseph, BBC Radio Wales

2010 

 Premier Award: Twin Sisters: Two Faiths, Ladbroke Productions for BBC Radio 4
 Runner-up: The Understanding, BBC Radio Drama for BBC Radio 4
 Merit: All Things Considered: Treasures out of Darkness, BBC Radio Wales
 Merit:  Dear God, BBC Coventry & Warwickshire
 Merit: Something Understood: Hospitality, Loftus Audio for BBC Radio 4

2009 

 Premier Award: Witness (Episode 4): Tested, BBC Religion & Ethics/BBC Drama for BBC Radio 4
 Runner-Up: Christmas Awakening, BBC Scotland
 Merit: Let us Pod: Bereavement, Clifton Diocese Website and BCfm Community Radio for Bristol
 Merit: Heart and Soul: Fatwas, BBC World Service

2007 
Premier Award: God and the Gun – BBC Religion for BBC Radio 4
Runner-up: Life Beyond Death – BBC World Service
Merit Award: Humphrys in Search of God – BBC Radio 4; 
Merit Award: Do You Have to be Religious to Get Elected? – BBC World Service

2006 
Premier Award: Cities Without Maps – BBC Religion and Ethics 
Runner-up: Reporting Religion – BBC World Service

2005 
Premier Award: The Rainbow Through the Rain – Premier Christian Radio
Runner-Up: Singing from a New Hymn Sheet from the series Crossing Continents – BBC Radio 4

2004 
Premier Award: The Choice – BBC Radio 4
Runner-up: At the Foot of the Cross: Stainer's The Crucifixion – BBC Radio 2

References

External links 
 Official website of Sandford St. Martin Trust

British television awards
Radio in the United Kingdom
Christian charities based in the United Kingdom
Religious broadcasting in the United Kingdom